This article lists the wide variety of locomotives and multiple units that have operated on Great Britain's railway network, since Nationalisation in 1948.

British Rail used several numbering schemes for classifying its steam locomotive types and other rolling stock, before settling on the TOPS computer system in the late 1960s. TOPS has remained in use ever since.

Steam locomotives

 Steam locomotives in use after 1968: Class 98

Diesel and electric locomotives

 Diesel locomotives: Classes 01–70
 DC electric and electro-diesel locomotives: Classes 70–79
 AC electric locomotives: Classes 80–96
 Departmental locos (those not in revenue-earning use): Class 97
 Miscellaneous locomotives, including builders' demonstrators.

Shipping fleet
British Rail's shipping fleet:

Diesel multiple units

 Units with mechanical or hydraulic transmission: Classes 100-199
 Units with electric transmission: Classes 200–299

Electric multiple units

 Overhead AC units: Classes 300–399
 Southern Region DC third rail EMUs: Classes 400–499
 Other DC EMUs: Classes 500–599

Alternative Fuel multiple units 

 British Rail Class 600
 British Rail Class 614

Departmental multiple units

 Classes 900-999

See also 
 British Rail coach type codes
 List of British Railways steam locomotives as of 31 December 1967
 List of British Railways shed codes

British Rail
British Rail classes
British Rail rolling stock